The 1976 Tirreno–Adriatico was the 11th edition of the Tirreno–Adriatico cycle race and was held from 12 March to 16 March 1976. The race started in Santa Marinella and finished in San Benedetto del Tronto. The race was won by Roger De Vlaeminck of the Brooklyn team.

General classification

References

1976
1976 in Italian sport